The Augustus Lilly House is a private house located at 132 Cora Street in Allegan, Michigan. It was added to the National Register of Historic Places in 1987.

History
Augustus Lilly was a farmer until he enlisted to fight in the Civil War. When he returned to Allegan, he partnered with Irving F. Clapp, and the pair opened a grocery store in Allegan. Lilly constructed this house in 1870.

Description
The Augustus Lilly House is a two-story L-shaped frame Italianate house with clapboard siding and a masonry foundation. The house has a low-pitched hipped roof.

References

National Register of Historic Places in Allegan County, Michigan
Italianate architecture in Michigan
Houses completed in 1870
1870 establishments in Michigan